Velika Gradusa is a village in central Croatia, in the municipality of Sunja, Sisak-Moslavina County. It is located in the Banija region.

History

Demographics
According to the 2011 census, the village of Velika Gradusa has 87 inhabitants. This represents 20.23% of its pre-war population.

According to the 1991 census, 96.28% of the village population were ethnic Serbs (414/430), 1.63% were Yugoslavs (7/430), 0.93% were ethnic Croats (4/430) and 1.16% were of other ethnic origin (5/430).

Notable natives and residents

References 

Populated places in Sisak-Moslavina County
Serb communities in Croatia